Tsuman is an urban-type settlement in Lutsk Raion of Volyn Oblast in Ukraine. It is located on the left bank of the Putylivka in the drainage basin of the Dnieper. Population:

Geography
Tsumanska Puscha National Nature Park is located in the area surrounding the locality.

Economy

Transportation
There is infrequent passenger traffic.

The settlement has access to Highway H22 connecting Lutsk with Rivne.

References

Urban-type settlements in Lutsk Raion